Jonkeri is a medium-sized lake of Finland. It belongs in the Vuoksi main catchment area and is situated in Kainuu region.

The Russian border is only four kilometers from the lake. In history the lake has been partly Russian. The border stone called Jonkerinkivi is situated on the lake and it shows the border place of 17th century based on the Treaty of Stolbovo.

See also
List of lakes in Finland

References

Lakes of Kuhmo